On a Tightrope (2007) is a documentary film by Petr Lom, co-produced by Piraya Film and Lom Films, in cooperation with the Rafto Foundation for Human Rights.

Synopsis
The film revolves around four children living in an orphanage in Xinjiang province, China. The children are Uyghurs, members of China's largest Muslim minority. Their dream is to become tightrope walkers, an ancient Uyghur tradition.

The children start learning to tightrope walk, but within a few months, they are judged inadequate by their coach. Now some of their dreams change: one wants to become a teacher, another a professional singer. One of them however, feels he is simply too small to be good at anything. Eventually, even the one judged most talented at tightrope walking, and the one who dreams of a place in the Guinness Book of World Records for tightrope walking, is let go by the unscrupulous coach who seems only interested in money.

One year later, a different coach comes to the orphanage. Through love and kindness, he turns the children's initial failure at tightrope walking into success. The film culminates with their performance on a high wire – without a safety net – in front of their entire home town.

Tightrope walking is in this movie a metaphor for how the Uyghurs try to balance between their Muslim faith and living in a communist state, where they are severely restricted in practicing their religion. This is the first film to ever document Chinese policy on religion in Xinjiang.

Awards
 Won – Warsaw International Film Festival 2006, Watch Doc Award
 Won – Chicago International Documentary Festival 2007, Grand Prix, Short.
 Nominated – One World Media Awards, London2007.

See also
 List of Islamic films
 Islam in China
 Uyghur people

External links
 
 
 Production company
 International distributor
 Norwegian distributor
 Official Website
 On a Tightrope at the Norwegian Film Institute

2007 films
Documentary films about children
Documentary films about Islam
Documentary films about China
Orphanages in China
Tightrope walking
2007 documentary films
Norwegian documentary films
Uyghur-language films
Islam in China
Documentary films about orphanages